The 1996–97 season was the 85th year of football played by Dundee United, and covered the period from 1 July 1996 to 30 June 1997. United finished in third place in the league following their promotion from the First Division and qualified for the UEFA Cup in the process. The club lost in the semi-finals of the Scottish Cup after a replay and were knocked out of the League Cup in a third round penalty shootout by rivals Dundee.

Season review
United finished the Scottish Premier Division 1996–97 season in 3rd place with 60 points, in the first season back in the top flight after the single season in the First Division. Despite taking just one point from the first six games, United finished third, with the appointment of Tommy McLean starting an immediate six-game unbeaten run, bettered later by a thirteen-game unbeaten succession, which included eight straight league wins.

The cup campaigns saw a 3rd round League Cup penalty shootout defeat to rivals Dundee and a semi-final Scottish Cup defeat (after a replay) to eventual winners Kilmarnock.

Off the pitch, United started a four-year successive run of 'Premier League Programme of the Year'.

Match results
Dundee United played a total of 44 competitive matches during the 1996–97 season. The team finished third in the Premier Division.

Legend

All results are written with Dundee United's score first.

Premier Division

Tennent's Scottish Cup

Coca-Cola Cup

Dundee beat United 4–3 on penalty kicks

Player details
During the 1996–97 season, United used 31 different players comprising five nationalities. The table below shows the number of appearances and goals scored by each player.

|}

Goalscorers
United had 12 players score with the team scoring 58 goals in total. The top goalscorer was Kjell Olofsson, who finished the season with 13 goals.

Discipline
United had three players sent off and seventeen players received at least one caution. In total, the team received three red cards and

Note: disciplinary statistics are missing for Coca-Cola match vs Dundee and Scottish Cup matches vs Kilmarnock

Team statistics

League table

Transfers

In
The club signed twelve players during the season with approximately £650k spent on transfer fees. In addition, three players were promoted from youth contracts: Paul Black, Craig Easton, Steven Thompson, with all three featuring at least once during the season.

Out
Ten players left the club during the season, with the club receiving over £1.35m in transfer sales, representing an overall transfer profit of around £700k.

Playing kit

The jerseys were sponsored for the first time by Telewest.

References

External links
 Glenrothes Arabs season review

Dundee United F.C. seasons
Dundee United